The Lima Cleaning and Pressing Company Building is a historic structure located along South Main Street in Lima, Ohio, United States.  Built in 1890, it is an example of an early style of commercial architecture.

Architecture
A small two-story brick building, the Lima Cleaning and Pressing Company Building has a facade three bays wide; possible storefronts, changed little from the original construction, are included on each side.  Between the entrances to the two portions of the building is an entrance to stairs to the upper floor, and stairs to the basement level can be found on each side; all of these stairways are accompanied by iron railings.  A unique wrought iron railing lines the edge of a second-story balcony, which can be accessed from the second floor by an elaborate double door.  Each of these aspects of the building, as well as details such as transoms and a heavily detailed cornice, distinguishes it from all other buildings in the city — no other Lima building features such cunningly made ironwork.

Construction
After the discovery of petroleum in the vicinity of Lima in 1885, the city's population grew greatly, and the construction of commercial buildings along South Main Street proceeded at a rapid pace.  Accompanying these new buildings in the southern Kibby Corners neighborhood were large numbers of frame houses erected as homes for the workers in the city's burgeoning industrial enterprises.  For many years, the Lima Cleaning and Pressing Company Building served as offices for dry cleaners and for plumbers.

Preservation
Today, much of South Main Street and Kibby Corners languish in a state of decay.  Many abandoned buildings have been demolished by the city government, and community areas such as parks and streetsides are becoming less attractive as a result of a lack of proper maintenance.  Two exceptions to this process of decay are the Lima Cleaning and Pressing Company Building and the adjacent Armory-Latisona Building; these two historic buildings have been identified as key to the area's historic nature.

In 1982, the Armory-Latisona Building and the Lima Cleaning and Pressing Company Building were two of seventeen buildings in Lima that were added to the National Register of Historic Places as part of the "Lima Multiple Resource Area."  Key to its inclusion in this group of properties was the integrity of the building's unique architecture.

References

1890s architecture in the United States
Former laundry buildings
Buildings and structures in Lima, Ohio
National Register of Historic Places in Allen County, Ohio
Commercial buildings on the National Register of Historic Places in Ohio
Commercial buildings completed in 1890